Guamo is a town and municipality in the Tolima department of Colombia.  The population of the municipality was 30,516 as of the 2018 census.

References

Municipalities of Tolima Department